Edgar Zaldívar Valverde (born 17 October 1996), also known as Gary, is a Mexican professional footballer who plays as a defensive midfielder for Liga MX club Atlas.

Career statistics

Club

Honours
Atlas
Liga MX: Apertura 2021, Clausura 2022
Campeón de Campeones: 2022

References

1996 births
Living people
Association football midfielders
Atlas F.C. footballers
Liga MX players
Liga Premier de México players
Tercera División de México players
Footballers from San Luis Potosí
People from San Luis Potosí City
Mexican footballers